Huntingdon railway station (formerly known as Huntingdon North) serves the town of Huntingdon in Cambridgeshire, England. The station is managed by Great Northern, although most services are operated by Thameslink. During engineering works or periods of disruption London North Eastern Railway services sometimes call at Huntingdon, but there is no regular London North Eastern Railway service from the station.

History

The latter closed to passenger traffic in June 1959, along with the line.

From the mid 1970s to the late 1980s the station was slowly rebuilt, going from a station with one platform connected to the ticket office and an island platform to an electrified station with the main platform, a bay platform as well as a separate platform for the slow line. The reason for this was that pre-1976, only three tracks went through the station causing a major bottleneck in the area.

From 1977, when King's Cross suburban electric services were introduced, until the main line to Peterborough was electrified in 1988, local services were provided by a diesel multiple-unit shuttle from Hitchin that started and terminated here – passengers for stations further south had to change at Hitchin onto the King's Cross–Royston outer suburban electric service. Certain East Coast main line services between London,  and York or Hull stopped here to provide onward connections for through passengers and offer direct trains to the capital. There were also a number of King's Cross–Peterborough through trains for commuters at peak times. Once electrification began, stops by longer-distance trains were gradually removed and had ceased by the time British Rail was privatised in 1995, as can be seen from the East Coast Main Line timetable of that era.

The station sustained an arson attack in 2005. Much of the station roof had to be rebuilt, as did the booking hall.

Train fire (1951)
On 14 July 1951 the West Riding express from London to Leeds, hauled by Class A3 60058, was on its way from London when a female passenger noticed a wisp of smoke rising between the arm rest of her seat and the side of the coach. She reported it to a pantry boy, who told the restaurant-car conductor, and the conductor told the guard. The guard noticed smoke seeping between the edge of the carpet and the coach side, and diagnosed a hot axle box. He decided to throw out a message to the Huntingdon station-master, as the train was approaching the station at the time.

Meanwhile, there was growing alarm in the affected coach as it filled with smoke. When a small flame appeared a male passenger decided it was high time to pull the emergency cord. After some delay, he duly did this. The driver made a full brake application and brought the train to a stop in 700 yards. By this time the flames suddenly spread with frightening rapidity up the coach sides and along the roof. The corridor became blocked with passengers trying to escape and some broke windows in order to jump out. Miraculously, although twenty-two people were injured, everybody managed to get out alive. The train staff were unable to isolate the two burning coaches from the rest of the train, and instead left them coupled to the next two coaches. As a result, four train coaches were destroyed by fire.

The cause of the fire was thought to be a hot ember in a hole in the coach floor, and the locomotive's firebar was missing. However, as with the Penmanshiel Tunnel fire two years previously, the circumstances were the same: the cellulose lacquer covering the corridor walls was found to be highly flammable with a very fast flame spread. It contained large amounts of nitrocellulose (68%). Draughts of air from the open windows may have fanned the flames.

Facilities
Huntingdon is staffed for most of the day. Automatic ticket barriers have been installed, as part of a wider programme by the former franchisee, First Capital Connect, to place them across large parts of the network as a revenue-protecting  and security exercise. The station has four touch-screen ticket machines.

There are toilet facilities at the station, as well as shelters on all platforms. The combined newsagent and buffet on the London-bound platform closed in August 2017, and new tenants are being sought. Vending machines are available on both platforms.

There is a taxi rank directly outside the entrance to the London-bound platforms. A considerable amount of parking space is provided adjacent to both platforms.

Services
Off-peak, all services at Huntingdon are operated by Thameslink using  EMUs.

The typical off-peak service in trains per hour is:
 2 tph to  via ,  and 

On Sundays, the service is reduced to hourly and southbound services run to London King's Cross instead of Horsham.

During times of engineering work in the Hitchin area, Huntingdon can operate as the terminus for London North Eastern Railway services from Scotland and the north-east of England, which are normally destined for London King's Cross. A rail replacement service usually runs from Huntingdon to Biggleswade or Stevenage to connect with services to or from London King's Cross. Huntingdon is also used as a stop for London North Eastern Railway services if Peterborough cannot be used.

Bus links
A bus concourse adjacent to the station is served by Stagecoach East Busway B, Whippet 477, Whippet 45 and Dews Coaches 400/401

Gallery

References

External links

Grade II listed buildings in Cambridgeshire
Railway stations in Cambridgeshire
DfT Category C2 stations
Former Great Northern Railway stations
Railway stations in Great Britain opened in 1850
Railway stations served by Govia Thameslink Railway
Huntingdon